You Love Only Once (also released as The Melody Haunts My Memory) is a 1981 Yugoslavian drama film directed by Rajko Grlić. It competed in the Un Certain Regard section at the 1981 Cannes Film Festival. In 1999, a poll of Croatian film critics said it to be one of the best Croatian films ever made.

Cast
 Miki Manojlović as Tomislav (as Predrag Manojlović)
 Vladislava Milosavljević as Beba (as Vladica Milosavljević)
 Mladen Budiščak as Vule
 Zijah Sokolović as Mirko
 Erland Josephson as Rudolf, Beba's father
 Dragoljub Lazarov as Pero
 Neva Rošić as Elizabeta, Beba's mother
 Miljenko Brlečić as Doctor
 Zvonko Lepetić as Party official
 Maja Freundlich as Maid
 Edo Peročević as Prison keeper
 Jagoda Kaloper as Jagoda

References

Sources

Further reading

External links

1981 films
1981 drama films
Serbo-Croatian-language films
Films directed by Rajko Grlić
Jadran Film films
Films set in Croatia
Croatian war drama films
Yugoslav war drama films